PT Pindad (Persero),  is an Indonesian state-owned enterprise specialising in military and commercial products. Pindad provides the armaments and munitions  for the Indonesian National Armed Forces and other uniformed agencies mainly to support the defense and security capabilities of the Republic of Indonesia.

Aside from the defense industry, Pindad also produces industrial products for other fields such as transportation and commercial explosives. Pindad's activities include design, development, engineering and fabrication as well as maintenance.

History

In 1808, Governor-General Daendels ordered the establishment of workshops for materiel, munitions, and weaponry maintenance named   in Surabaya, which acted as a precursor to the defense industry in Indonesia. The government further established naval materiel and explosives factory named  in 1850. On 1 January 1851, PW was renamed .

During the period 1923–1932, workshops in Surabaya were moved to Bandung and merged into a single entity named . During Japanese occupation of the Dutch East Indies, ACW was renamed  Dai Ichi Kozo (DIK). And afterward it was renamed .

On 29 April 1950, following the agreement on Dutch–Indonesian Round Table Conference, whereas Netherlands transferred sovereignty to United States of Indonesia, the Netherlands Ministry of Defense also transferred LPB to the Indonesian National Armed Forces and the Ministry of Defense. LPB was later renamed into  and its management was entrusted to the Indonesian Army, making it a nationalized military industrial firm.

PSM was renamed Pabrik Alat Peralatan Angkatan Darat (Pabal AD) in 1958, and in 1962 into Perindustrian TNI Angkatan Darat (Pindad).

COVID-19
During the COVID-19 pandemic in Indonesia, PT. Pindad developed a ventilator prototype to be used as a breathing aid for COVID-19 patients. As the number of patients rose and demand for medical equipment in the country skyrocketed, Pindad produced and distributed inexpensive ventilators to hospitals across Indonesia.

Awards
Pindad has received awards for the creation of the Pindad SS1 and Pindad SS2 rifles that enabled the Indonesian Army to win at ASEAN Army Rifle Meet XVI contest in 2006.

Facilities
The munitions division is located in Turen, Malang and has production facilities and laboratories on 166 hectares.

Known products

Weapons
Sidearms
 Pindad R1
 Pindad P1 
 Pindad P2
 Pindad P3 
 Pindad P-3A
 Pindad PS-01
 Pindad G2 
 Pindad MAG4
Submachine Guns
 Pindad PM1 
 Pindad PM2
 Pindad PM3
 Pindad SKPK
Shotguns
 SG-1
Assault Rifles
 Pindad SS1
 Pindad SS2
Battle Rifles
 SP-1 
 Pindad SS3
Machine Guns
 Pindad SMR Madsen Saetter
 Pindad SM2
 Pindad SM3 
 Pindad SM5
 Pindad SMB-1 
Sniper Rifles
 Pindad SPR-1
 Pindad SPR-2
 Pindad SPR-3
 Pindad SPR-4
Grenade Launchers
 Pindad SPG-1
 Pindad SPG-2 
 Pindad SPG-3
Non-lethal weapons
 PG BT1 (stun baton)
 PG Alpha-1 (stun flashlight)
 PG TZ1 (taser)
Others
 Pindad PI Flare gun
 Pindad Mo-1 Mortar 60mm Mortar
 Pindad Mo-2 Mortar 60mm Mortar
 Pindad Mo-3 Mortar 81mm Mortar
 Pindad 40mm Silent Mortar
 Pindad ME-105 105mm Howitzer
 Pindad PK-1 field knife
 Pindad PL-1 throwing knife

Vehicles
Armored Vehicles
 Pindad A.yani (APC)
 Pindad U.yani (APC)
 Pindad APR-1V
 Pindad APS-1
 Pindad APS-2
 Pindad APS-3 Anoa
 Pindad Komodo
 Pindad Sanca
 Pindad Elang
 Pindad Cobra
 Pindad Maung

Fire Support Vehicles

 Pindad Badak

Tank
 Harimau

Water Vehicles and Machinery
 Work Boat Amphibious (WBA)
 Pindad TPS (Garbage trapper barge)

Civilian Vehicles
 Pindad MotoEV
 Pindad MV2

Agricultural equipment
 Paddy dryer
 PA-1800 (tiller/rotavator)
 PP-160 (harvester)
 AMH-O
 Stungta x Pindad Incinerator

Heavy equipment
 Excava 50 (excavator)
 Excava 200 (excavator), Excava 200 long arm, Excava 200 amphibious
 PTM-45 (agricultural tractor)
 PTM-90 (agricultural tractor)
 Telehandler

References

External links

 Official website

Firearm manufacturers of Indonesia
Truck manufacturers of Indonesia
Government-owned companies of Indonesia
Defense companies of Indonesia
Companies based in Bandung
Manufacturing companies established in 1808
1800s establishments in the Dutch East Indies
1808 establishments in the Netherlands
1808 establishments in Oceania
Agriculture companies of Indonesia
Indonesian brands